Jimmy Reid (1932–2010) was a Scottish trade union activist, orator, politician and journalist.

Jimmy Reid may also refer to:
 Jimmy Reid (footballer, born 1879) (1879–1976), Scottish footballer for Port Vale, West Ham United and Tottenham Hotspur
 Jimmy Reid (footballer, born 1890) (1890–1938), Scottish footballer for Lincoln City, Airdrieonians and Clydebank
 Jimmy Reid (footballer, born 1935) (1935–2017), Scottish footballer for Dundee United, Bury and Stockport County

See also
 Jim Reid (disambiguation)
 James Reid (disambiguation)